Albini LeBlanc (born 1894 in Bouctouche) was a Canadian clergyman and prelate for the Roman Catholic Diocese of Gaspé. He was appointed bishop in 1940 in Hearst, Ontario, and to his later post in 1945. He died in 1957.

References 

1894 births
1957 deaths
Canadian Roman Catholic bishops